Carclew is a Federation style mansion built in 1897, located in the Adelaide suburb of North Adelaide, overlooking the Adelaide city centre city from Montefiore Hill. The name is now better known as the cultural organisation dedicated to artistic development of young people, now known simply as Carclew, which has been housed in the building since 1971 (and then named the South Australian Performing Arts Centre for Young People, and with several name changes since).

History
The site was originally sold in the first Adelaide land sale of 1837, purchased by George Curtis for 12 shillings. In 1861 the site contained a simple two-storey brick dwelling, a wall surrounding the house and a stable. It was purchased by a stockbroker James Chambers in 1861, who in the same year sponsored the expedition of John McDouall Stuart, which was launched from the site. A plaque on the property's surrounding wall commemorates the event. The expedition was the first successful European crossing of the continent, but James Chambers died at the property before Stuart's return.

In 1862 the site was purchased by businessman, politician and philanthropist Hugh Robert Dixon (later Sir Hugh Robert Denison), who demolished the existing home, leaving only the wall surrounding the property and the stable. Dixon erected the current grander building in 1897 (or 1901?) and called it "Stalheim" (perhaps after the town in Norway).

In 1908, the building was sold to Sir John Langdon Bonython, editor of The Advertiser and member of the first Parliament of Australia. Bonython renamed the building "Carclew" after the area in Cornwall where his ancestors had lived. The property remained in the Bonython family until 1965, when it was purchased by the Adelaide City Council.

After a 2006 architects' report recommending maintenance work on the structure of the building, the Government of South Australia undertook the construction work, which was completed in October 2009.

Architecture
The house was designed by John Quintin Bruce, a prominent Adelaide architect, who also designed Electra House in King William Street and the Freemasons Hall on North Terrace.

The building is an architecturally significant Federation-style mansion, and stands in a prominent position next to Light's Vision. The two-storey building is constructed of sandstone, rusticated brick quoins and has cement decoration, with timber balconies and verandahs, and an iron roof, except for that of the three-storey tower, which is made of slate. There is ornate woodwork on the gables.

The decorated archway at the main entrance leads to an entrance hall. From there, the main staircase leads upstairs to what were once the family quarters. The ground floor included a ballroom, morning room, parlour, kitchen scullery, and conservatory. There was a room for the servants with a separate entrance. The single-storey library was added in 1908.

Youth arts centre
In 1971 Premier Don Dunstan created the South Australian Performing Arts Centre for Young People, which was incorporated in 1972. In 1976 it was renamed the Carclew Youth Arts Centre. Its mandate was changed in 1982 to focus on performing arts, and the name was changed to the Carclew Youth Performing Arts Centre.

From late 1988, the mandate was widened to include a broader range of the arts, and to include people up to 26 years old and the name changed back to Carclew Youth Arts Centre to reflect this in March 1991. In 2009 the name again changed, this time to Carclew Youth Arts, and finally to Carclew in 2013.

Carclew is unique in South Australia as a multi-art-form centre for young people. It runs programs, workshops, projects and funding opportunities, including scholarships, project grants and mentoring opportunities. It also provides connections with schools and other arts organisations.

In February 2019, a new program by Creative Consultants was launched through Carclew, to help young artists to earn a stable income over the course of their careers. Also in 2019, the City of Adelaide is collaborating with Carclew to deliver the "Emerging Curator Program", a six-month engagement in which three aspiring curators are supported in their professional development.

Governance
The Centre was managed by the Youth Performing Arts Council from 1980, which was established specifically to manage Carclew. After a need for an organisation with a broader focus to manage youth arts policy and programs, the South Australian Youth Arts Board was created and took over in November 1988, at which time the Centre's focus was also expanded.

Reporting to the Minister for the Arts, Carclew's funding was the responsibility of Arts South Australia until 2018, when the position of Arts Minister was abolished and it was moved, along with the History of South Australia, Patch Theatre Company and Windmill Theatre Company, to the Department of Education.

In July 2019, the state budget slashed funding to the History Trust, Carclew and Windmill, as part of "operational efficiency" cuts.

References

Houses in Adelaide
North Adelaide
Drama schools in Australia
Arts in South Australia
Arts organisations based in Australia